Qaisar is  the Arabic version of the name Caesar and it is used as a given name in Arabia. The Roman and later Byzantine emperors were called Qaisar-e-Rum (Caesar of Rome) by the Arabs and Persians. The Ottoman Sultans also took the title Kayser-i Rum (Caesar of Rome, meaning the Byzantine Empire) after conquering Constantinople, modern Istanbul, on May 29, 1453. The British monarchs also used the title Kaisar-i-Hind or Emperor of India during the late 19th and early 20th-century.

See also 

 Qaisar Bagh, "Emperor's Garden" in Lucknow, India

External links 
 Captive Roman emperor before the Persian Shahanshah Shapur II.

Unisex given names
Arabic unisex given names
Imperial titles